The 2005 United Kingdom Budget, officially known as Investing for our future: Fairness and opportunity for Britain’s hard-working families was the formal government budget for the year 2005.

Details

Tax Revenue

Spending

References 

United Kingdom budget
Budget
Gordon Brown
United Kingdom budgets